The Lost Child (Spanish:El niño perdido) is a 1947 Mexican comedy film directed by Humberto Gómez Landero and starring Germán Valdés, Marcelo Chávez and Emilia Guiú.

Cast
 Germán Valdés as Agustín peón Torre y Rey; Tincito 
 Marcelo Chávez as Pioquinto Chumacero; Quintín Caballero 
 Miguel Arenas as Don Jacobo Peón  
 Luis G. Barreiro as Ataúlfo  
 Ramiro Gamboa as Voz de narrador (voice)  
 Conchita Gentil Arcos as Pita Torre  
 Jesús Graña as Don Chucho, coreógrafo  
 Maruja Grifell as Pura Torre  
 Emilia Guiú as Estrella / Petra  
 Lupe Inclán as Segunda, nana  
 Ramón G. Larrea as Dueño de cabaret  
 Raúl Lechuga as Empresario  
 Manuel Noriega as Don Pepe  
 Humberto Rodríguez as Humberto, mesero  
 Aurora Ruiz as Severiana, sirvienta  
 María Valdealde as Espectadora teatro

References

Bibliography 
 Carlos Monsiváis & John Kraniauskas. Mexican Postcards. Verso, 1997.

External links 
 

1947 films
1947 comedy films
Mexican comedy films
1940s Spanish-language films
Films directed by Humberto Gómez Landero
Mexican black-and-white films
1940s Mexican films